The 2019–20 season was the Manitoba Junior Hockey League's (MJHL) 103rd year of operation.  The league did not have a champion as the season was cancelled midway through the first round of the league playoffs due to the COVID-19 pandemic.

Season notes
The MJHL reduces the number of 20-year-old players permitted on each team's roster from eight to seven. 
The Portage Terriers are selected to host the 2020 Centennial Cup, the 50th season the National Junior 'A' Championship is to be played.  This championship is later cancelled because of the COVID-19 pandemic.
The Winnipeg Blues are sold to 50 Below Sports & Entainment, Inc., which also owns the Winnipeg Ice of the Western Hockey League.  The team relocates to The Rink Training Centre near Oak Bluff, just outside of Winnipeg.
The annual Showcase takes place at Seven Oaks Arena in Winnipeg September 20–22, 2019.
The MJHL and SJHL hold a joint showcase in Regina, Saskatchewan January 19–23, 2020.
League Commissioner Kim Davis announces his retirement after 19 seasons.
Hockey Canada and the Canadian Junior Hockey League cancel the remainder of the 2019-20 hockey season on March 12, 2020 due to the COVID-19 pandemic in Canada. This is the first season the Turnbull Cup has not been awarded since its creation in 1920.

Standings

Playoffs
Playoff brackets at the time of cancellation on March 12, 2020.

Post MJHL playoffs
ANAVET Cup
 Cancelled as of March 12, 2020
Centennial Cup
Portage Terriers (host team)
 Cancelled as of March 12, 2020

League awards 
 Steve "Boomer" Hawrysh Award (MVP): Grady Hobbs, Dauphin
 Ed Belfour Top Goaltender Trophy: Matt Lenz, Steinbach
 Brian Kozak Award (Top Defenceman): Drake Burgin, Winkler
 Vince Leah Trophy (Rookie of the Year): Carter Loney, Steinbach
 Frank McKinnon Memorial Trophy (Hockey Ability and Sportsmanship): Ty Naaykens, Steinbach
 Muzz McPherson Award (Coach of the Year): Kelvin Cech, Winkler
 Mike Ridley Trophy (Scoring Champion): Mikol Sartor, Winnipeg

See also
ANAVET Cup
2020 Centennial Cup

References

External links
 MJHL Website
 2019-20 MJHL season at HockeyDB.com

Manitoba Junior Hockey League seasons
MJHL
MJHL